Ellenbeckia is a genus of moths in the family Sphingidae, consisting of one species Ellenbeckia monospila, which is known from arid areas in Kenya and Somalia.

The length of the forewings is about 19 mm for males and 21 mm for females. The body and wings are grey. The forewings have veins which are finely delineated in black, a small blackish stigma and a paler marginal band. There is a large blackish grey rounded spot, outlined in pale grey near the tornus. The hindwings are uniform grey.

References

Sphingini
Moths described in 1903
Moths of Africa
Monotypic moth genera
Taxa named by Walter Rothschild
Taxa named by Karl Jordan